The Union Defence Force may refer to a former or current military organization:
 Union Defence Force (South Africa), the predecessor of the South African Defence Force from 1912 to 1957
 Union Defence Force (UAE), the armed forces of the United Arab Emirates

See also 

 UDF (disambiguation)